Cole Joseph Frank Mazza (born February 14, 1995) is an American football long snapper for the Houston Gamblers of the United States Football League (USFL). He played college football at Alabama.

College career
Mazza was served as the starting long snapper Alabama Crimson Tide for four seasons, including the team's 2015 National Championship year. He missed only two games in four years due to injury and finished his collegiate career without a single botched snap in 583 attempts. Following his senior season Mazza was invited to participate in the 2017 Senior Bowl.

Professional career
Mazza garnered little NFL interest after graduating and worked for two years as a fitness coach until earning a tryout from the Alliance of American Football.

Birmingham Iron
Mazza was signed by the Birmingham Iron of the Alliance of American Football. He served as the long snapper in all eight of the team's games before the league folded.

Los Angeles Chargers
Mazza was signed by the Los Angeles Chargers on April 8, 2019. Mazza beat out nine year incumbent Mike Windt to become the Chargers' long snapper for the 2019 season. Mazza made his NFL debut on September 8, 2019 against the Indianapolis Colts. Mazza served as the Chargers' long snapper for all 16 games in his first NFL season.

On August 30, 2021, Mazza was waived/injured by the Chargers and placed on injured reserve. He was released on September 8, 2021.

Houston Gamblers
On January 19, 2023, Mazza signed with the Houston Gamblers of the United States Football League (USFL).

References

External links
 Alabama Crimson Tide bio
 Los Angeles Chargers bio

1995 births
Living people
American football long snappers
Los Angeles Chargers players
Players of American football from Bakersfield, California
Alabama Crimson Tide football players
Birmingham Iron players
Houston Gamblers (2022) players